Thorrun Govind is a British pharmacist and solicitor. In 2021 she was elected chair of the Royal Pharmaceutical Society in England, the professional body for pharmacists.

Early life and education 
Govind graduated from King's College London with a master of pharmacy degree. Undertaking professional training in Newark on Trent she registered as a pharmacist with the General Pharmaceutical Council. She subsequently studied for a graduate diploma in law and qualifications in law, business and management at the University of Law. She is a qualified solicitor and member of the Law Society in England.

Govind was first elected to the Royal Pharmaceutical Society's English Pharmacy Board in 2018, the youngest elected board member. She was subsequently elected to chair the Royal Pharmaceutical Society's English Pharmacy Board in 2021, the youngest elected chair that the organisation has had, and continues to chair this board.

In 2022, Govind became a Councillor at the Commonwealth Pharmacists Association.

Career 
In 2018 she was nominated for the NHS70 Parliamentary Awards - Healthier Communities Award for her advocacy. In the same year Govind was named one of the Top 5 Rising Star's in Healthcare by WeAretheCity, an organisation that works with over 150 corporate organisations to attract, retain and develop female talent.

Govind was the Resident Pharmacist at BBC Radio Lancashire, on presenter John Gilmore's show.

Govind is credited as a leading expert in the healthcare sector and has regularly been asked to provide healthcare comment on the Coronavirus pandemic. She has also continued to highlight the challenges pharmacists and healthcare teams face. She has also spoken on a number of outlets including BBC News about the key role of pharmacists and healthcare teams in tackling vaccine hesitancy in relation to both Coronavirus and Influenza Vaccines.

In 2021 Govind spoke to Sky News about access to the contraception pill from pharmacies. She stated that 'it's absolutely right that women should be able to access contraception easily in a safe environment.' In 2022 Govind has also helped highlight women's health inequalities as an expert for Menopause Mandate. This advocacy has also involved highlighting the difficulties women are having with HRT shortages.

In 2023, a survey by the Royal Pharmaceutical Society reported that one in two pharmacists had seen a rise in people not collecting their prescription.  Speaking on BBC Breakfast Govind called for the prescription charge to be scrapped 'on par with Scotland, Wales and Northern Ireland where they do not pay prescription charges'.

Selected publications 
Robinson, Anna; Sile, Laura; Govind, Thorrun; Guraya, Harpreet Kaur; O'Brien, Nicola; Harris, Vicki; Pilkington, Guy; Todd, Adam; Husband, Andy (2022-04-05). "'He or she maybe doesn't know there is such a thing as a review': A qualitative investigation exploring barriers and facilitators to accessing medication reviews from the perspective of people from ethnic minority communities". Health Expectations: hex.13482. doi:10.1111/hex.13482. ISSN 1369-6513

Robinson, Anna; O'Brien, Nicola; Sile, Laura; Guraya, Harpreet K.; Govind, Thorrun; Harris, Vicki; Pilkington, Guy; Todd, Adam; Husband, Andy (2022-12). "Recommendations for community pharmacy to improve access to medication advice for people from ethnic minority communities: A qualitative person‐centred codesign study". Health Expectations. 25 (6): 3040–3052.

References

External link 
https://www.pharmacymagazine.co.uk/podcasts/pharmacy-magazine-in-conversation-with-thorrun-govindhttps://www.thepharmacyshow.co.uk/speakers/thorrun-govindhttps://www.rpharms.com/about-us/who-we-are/national-boards/english-board

Alumni of King's College London
English pharmacists

Year of birth missing (living people)
Living people